The 2006 European Mixed Curling Championship was held from October 17 to 21, 2006 in Claut, Friuli-Venezia Giulia, Italy.

Scotland, skipped by Tom Brewster, won its first title, defeating Italy in the final.

Teams
The teams are as follows:

Round Robin
In every group: two best teams to playoffs.

Group A

 Team to playoffs

Group B

 Team to playoffs

Group C

 Team to playoffs
 Teams to tie-break for 2nd place

Tie-break
Winner of Round 2 to playoffs

Round 1

Round 2

Group D

 Team to playoffs
 Teams to tie-break for 2nd place

Tie-break

Playoffs

Quarterfinals
October 20, 19:00

Semifinals
October 21, 10:00

Bronze medal game
October 21, 14:00

Final
October 21, 14:00

Final standings

References

 
2006 in curling
2006 in Italian sport
Sport in Friuli-Venezia Giulia
European Mixed Curling Championship
International curling competitions hosted by Italy
October 2006 sports events in Europe
Province of Pordenone